Snowy Jade Cave (a.k.a. Snow Jade Cave or Xueyu Cave) is a National Three Gorges Scenic Area and a National 4A Scenic Area located in Fengdu County, Chongqing Municipality, People's Republic of China, not far from the Yangtze River.

Description

The cave's interior is China's only pure-white, jade-like example. It continues to expand due to erosion in the surrounding karst landscape.  long, of which  have been explored,

Snowy Jade Cave is spread over three levels. There are also numerous examples of corals.

The surrounding area is also home to rare animal species including macaque, wild boar, and golden pheasant.

See also
 Fengdu Ghost City, a nearby visitor attraction 12 km away
 Furong Cave

References

External links

 Photograph of Stone King's Flag (石旗王)

Caves of Chongqing
Karst caves
Karst formations of China
Tourist attractions in Chongqing
AAAA-rated tourist attractions
Year of establishment missing